Holly Ffion Humberstone (born 17 December 1999) is an English singer-songwriter from Grantham, England. In 2021, she signed a recording contract with Interscope and Polydor Records. Her first EP following the signings, The Walls Are Way Too Thin, was released on 12 November 2021. Humberstone won the Brit Award for Rising Star at the 2022 Brit Awards.

Early life
Humberstone is from Grantham and is one of four sisters. Both her parents are medics. She studied at the Liverpool Institute for Performing Arts.

Humberstone  started writing songs at a young age. She has discussed growing up in a small town, stating there was  "no music scene growing up in rural Lincolnshire, so I just really did my own thing" in an interview with The Telegraph. Humberstone was formerly a violinist for the  Lincolnshire Youth Symphony Orchestra and was first spotted by a manager whilst performing on her local BBC Music Introducing radio show.

Career
Humberstone performed at Glastonbury Festival 2019 on the BBC Music Introducing stage. Her debut single "Deep End" was then released on 30 January 2020. Her second single, "Falling Asleep at the Wheel", was released on 19 March, while her third single, "Overkill", was released on 26 June. On 30 July 2020, she released a cover of "Fake Plastic Trees" by the English rock band Radiohead. Her debut EP, also titled Falling Asleep at the Wheel, was released on 14 August, which contained her three previous singles, alongside the tracks "Vanilla", "Drop Dead" and "Livewire". On 9 December 2020, she was included in Vevo DSCVR's Artists to Watch 2021. She performed her song "Vanilla" on the channel.

In March 2021, ahead of the release of her single "Haunted House" and her second EP, Humberstone signed with Polydor Records in the United Kingdom and Darkroom/Interscope Records in the United States. She also signed a publishing deal with Universal Music Publishing Group.

On 13 October 2021, Humberstone performed "Scarlett" from her EP, The Walls Are Way Too Thin, on The Tonight Show Starring Jimmy Fallon. On 9 December 2021, it was announced that Humberstone had been awarded the Brit Award for Rising Star, which recognises pop's most promising new acts to watch. Sam Fender surprised Humberstone with the award whilst they were recording an acoustic duet of his song "Seventeen Going Under". On 21 January 2022, she released the single "London is Lonely" from her forthcoming debut studio album set to be released in 2023.

Humberstone was the opening act for Girl in Red's Make It Go Quiet Tour of North America in March 2022, and was also the opening act for the second half of the North American leg of Olivia Rodrigo's Sour Tour. Humberstone also performed on the Future Sounds stage at BBC Radio 1's Big Weekend 2022 in Coventry. Sleep Tight, her second single from the forthcoming debut studio album, was released on 29 April 2022. On 25 June 2022 Humberstone performed on the John Peel stage at Glastonbury. Since then she performed as an opening act for the George Ezra Concert in Finsbury Park, London, on Sunday 17 July.

Musical style and influences
Humberstone music has been described as pop, synth-pop, indie rock, alternative rock and pop rock. Her music style has been compared to artists such as Lorde and Bon Iver given its intimate and atmospheric style. Humberstone cites Damien Rice, Ben Howard, Phoebe Bridgers, and HAIM as musical inspirations. Rice's debut studio album O (2002) is considered by Humberstone to be her 'first favourite album'. She has stated she mostly identifies with "female writers who overshare", and has described her own musical style as "quite self-exposing".

Discography

Compilation albums

Extended plays

Singles

References

External links

 
 
 
 

British women singers
British pop rock singers
British songwriters
Living people
Musicians from Lincolnshire
People from Grantham
Brit Award winners
1999 births